Tolmie State Park is a public recreation area covering  on Nisqually Beach on Puget Sound,  northeast of Olympia, Washington. The state park includes  of saltwater shoreline at the mouth of a creek known as Big Slough as well as forest lands, a saltwater marsh, and an underwater park with artificial reef for scuba diving.

History
The park was named after William Fraser Tolmie, a Hudson's Bay Company officer. The state began acquiring land for the state park in 1962.

Activities and amenities
Park activities include hiking on three miles of trails, boating, swimming, scuba diving, fishing, crabbing, and bird watching.

References

External links
Tolmie State Park Washington State Parks and Recreation Commission 
Tolmie State Park Map Washington State Parks and Recreation Commission

Parks in Thurston County, Washington
State parks of Washington (state)
Protected areas established in 1962